Dmitrijs Trefilovs (born 13 May 1987) is a Latvian gymnast. He represented Latvia at 2012 Summer Olympics. Trefilovs was 12th in individual all-around at European Championships 2010.

References

External links

 
 
 

1987 births
Living people
Latvian male artistic gymnasts
Sportspeople from Riga
Gymnasts at the 2012 Summer Olympics
Olympic gymnasts of Latvia
European Games competitors for Latvia
Gymnasts at the 2015 European Games